Polypoid melanoma is a rare cutaneous condition, a virulent variant of nodular melanoma. Polypoid melanoma is a subtype of nodular melanoma, the most aggressive form of melanoma (a skin cancer).

Polypoid melanoma, like all types of melanoma, starts in the cells that make melanin, which is the protective pigment that gives skin color. Polypoid melanoma is most commonly found on the torso but may be found in unexpected places like the nasal mucous membranes and the rectum. Sometimes polypoid melanoma may develop on moles on your skin, but it usually occurs out of nowhere on normal skin. Polypoid melanoma can be treated if it's diagnosed early, but the disease progresses very rapidly and has a worse prognosis than many other types of melanoma.

Treatment
Therapies for metastatic melanoma include the biologic immunotherapy agents ipilimumab, pembrolizumab, and nivolumab; BRAF inhibitors, such as vemurafenib and dabrafenib; and a MEK inhibitor trametinib.

See also 
 Melanoma
 List of cutaneous conditions

References 

Melanoma